Giovanni Scatturin (30 May 1893 – 11 October 1951) was an Italian rower, born in Venice, who competed in the 1920 Summer Olympics and in the 1924 Summer Olympics.

In 1920 he won the gold medal as crew member of the Italian boat in the coxed pair event. Four years later he won the silver medal with the Italian boat in the same event.

References

External links
 profile

1893 births
1951 deaths
Sportspeople from Venice
Italian male rowers
Olympic gold medalists for Italy
Olympic rowers of Italy
Olympic silver medalists for Italy
Rowers at the 1920 Summer Olympics
Rowers at the 1924 Summer Olympics
Olympic medalists in rowing
Medalists at the 1924 Summer Olympics
Medalists at the 1920 Summer Olympics
European Rowing Championships medalists